Pen-Llyn is a hamlet in the community of Bodedern, Ynys Môn, Wales, between Bodedern and Llanddeusant, some 4.5 miles from Valley. Llyn Llywenan, the largest natural lake on the island is nearby.

References

See also 
 List of localities in Wales by population

Villages in Anglesey